Union Free School is a historic school building located at Downsville in Delaware County, New York, United States. It was built in 1903-1906 and is a large "T" shaped wood-framed building on a raised foundation of concrete and bluestone.  The main section of the school is two and one half stories with a hipped roof and features a decorative belfry.

It was listed on the National Register of Historic Places in 2004.

See also
National Register of Historic Places listings in Delaware County, New York

References

National Register of Historic Places in Delaware County, New York
Defunct schools in New York (state)
School buildings completed in 1903
Buildings and structures in Delaware County, New York
1903 establishments in New York (state)